Gill Adarsh Matriculation Higher Secondary School is a co-educational matriculation school by the Punjab Association. It is located in Royapettah, Chennai, India.

President Giani Zail Singh dedicated Gill Adarsh Matriculation Higher Secondary School to the founder, Lt Col G.S. Gill.  The school has a student strength of around 3500 with over 110 class rooms. 
The school is based on State board's Samacheer Kalvi system. The school was established in 1980 and their motto is Duty, Devotion and Discipline.

References

Primary schools in Tamil Nadu
High schools and secondary schools in Chennai
Educational institutions established in 1980
1980 establishments in Tamil Nadu